Ahmad Madoun was a Syrian artist. He was norn in Palmyra in 1941 and died in a car crash in 1983.

He became distinguished in the field of plastic arts in Syria . He studied art privately. His home city inspired many of his paintings. His painting Celebration provides a sample of his style.

His works are visible in the national museum in Damascus-Culture Ministry. Special collections of his works are found in: 
Syria
Egypt
Germany
America
France
Switzerland
Sweden
Japan
India
Kuwait
Mexico
Belgium

References

External links
 Official website

1941 births
1983 deaths
Syrian male artists
20th-century Syrian painters
20th-century Syrian artists
Road incident deaths in Syria